Great Clifton is a village and civil parish in the Borough of Allerdale in the English county of Cumbria.  In the 2001 census, it has a population of 1,101, increasing slightly to 1,114 at the 2011 Census.

Location

Features
The village has a post office, general store and three pubs.

The village school, Derwent Vale Primary School, was built in 1995. Its predecessor was in a building opposite the old pit, now a private residence.

There are several wind farms nearby, one being the Winscales Moor Wind Farm whose Community Fund has contributed money to the local village hall.

The local rugby league team, the Great Clifton Lions, currently compete in the CARLA League.

Governance
Great Clifton is part of the parliamentary constituency of Workington. In the 2019 United Kingdom general election, the Tory candidate for Workington, Mark Jenkinson, was elected MP, overturning a 9.4 per cent Labour majority from the 2017 election to eject Shadow Environment Secretary Sue Hayman by a margin of 4,136 votes. Until the December 2019 general election, the Labour Party had won the seat in every general election since 1979.The Conservative Party had only been elected once in Workington since World War II, at the 1976 by-election. Historically Great Clifton has been a Labour-supporting area.

Before Brexit, it was in the North West England European Parliamentary Constituency.

For Local Government purposes it is in the Stainburn + Clifton Ward of Allerdale Borough Council and the St Johns + Great Clifton Division of Cumbria County Council.

Great Clifton has its own Parish Council; Great Clifton Parish Council.

Notable people
Ex Footballer John Burridge lived in the village as a child, he mentioned this in his autobiography Budgie.

Listed building
There is one listed building in the parish, the house at No. 5 Middlegate.  It is roughcast with a green slate roof, and has two storeys and three bays.  The doorway has an architrave with a pediment, and the windows are sashes.

References

External links
 Cumbria County History Trust: Great Clifton (nb: provisional research only – see Talk page)

Villages in Cumbria
Allerdale
Civil parishes in Cumbria